This is a list of yearly Big South Conference football standings.

Big South standings

References

Big South Conference
Standings